Arifa Pervin Zaman (born 3 November,1972), better known by her stage name Moushumi, is a Bangladeshi film actress and director. She won Bangladesh National Film Award for Best Actress three times for her roles in Meghla Akash (2001), Devdas (2013) and Taarkata (2014). She has acted in over 150 films and made her directorial debut with Kokhono Megh Kokhono Brishti (2003).

Career
Moushumi began working as an actress and singer from an early age. She stared in many movies and won many prizes. She won the Anonda Bichittra Photo Beauty Contest, which led to appearances in television commercials in the 1990s. She first appeared in the film Keyamat Theke Keyamat in Bangladesh.

Personal life
In 1996, Moushumi took a break for six months from acting and announced her engagement to actor Omar Sani. The couple have two children. Moushumi has a younger sister, Erin Zaman.

Moushumi runs a production house, Kopotakhsma Cholochitra. She was associated with Projapoti Cholochitra and she looks after her own foundation, the "Moushumi Welfare Foundation".

In September 2013, Moushumi was named a UNICEF goodwill ambassador.

Filmography

Actress

Director
 Kokhono Megh Kokhono Brishti (2003)
 Meher Negar (2006) jointly with Gulzar
 Shunno Hridoy (2014)

Television appearances

Drama

TV program
 Judge of the TV competition "Super Hero Super Heroine", aired on ntv
 Judge of the reality show "Power Voice", aired on Channel 9
 Talk Show "Ekdin Sharadin" with Ferdous Ahmed, aired on Channel i on Eid-ul-Fitr in 2015

Awards

References

External links
 
 
 

 

Living people
People from Khulna
Bangladeshi television actresses
Bangladeshi female models
Bangladeshi film actresses
Bangladeshi women film directors
Best Actress National Film Awards (Bangladesh) winners
Best Film Actress Meril-Prothom Alo Award winners
Best Actress Bachsas Award winners
1973 births